The 2022–23 Lindenwood Lions men's ice hockey season was the inaugural season of varsity play for the program. The Lions represented Lindenwood University and were coached by Rick Zombo, in his 13th season.

Season
With nearly two years lead time into their first season, Lindenwood was able to compile a full slate of games against Division I opponents. Predictably, as the team was still populated by club team players, the Lions were one of the worst squads in the nation. However, among the poor results there were bright spots. Lindenwood got a baptism of fire by playing both Minnesota and Michigan, two prohibitive favorites for the NCAA championship, in the first two weeks of the season. While the Lions lost all four games, they did show the ability to score. Over the course of the year, Lindenwood averaged just over 3 goals per game, which was well on par with most other D-I programs.

The biggest problem for the Lions was keeping the puck out of their own net. Lindenwood allowed an average of almost 42 shots against per game, much higher than the nominal 30 shots. Their three besieges goalies were unable to handle the sheer volume of chances that were thrown in their direction with each surrendering more than 4 goals per game on average. The defensive situation didn't get any better as the season progressed but that didn't stop the Lions from winning several games in their first season.

Despite having several extended layoffs during the campaign, as well as mostly playing on the road, Lindenwood was able to win 7 games during the season. While each victory came against a team with a low national ranking, they had performed far better than other recent entries to D-I (Stonehill, St. Thomas) and would look to continue their transition to the top level of college hockey next year.

Departures

Recruiting

Roster
As of August 16, 2022.

|}

Standings

Schedule and results

|-
!colspan=12 style=";" | Regular Season

Scoring statistics

Goaltending statistics

Rankings

Note: USCHO did not release a poll in weeks 1, 13, or 26.

References

2022-23
Lindenwood
Lindenwood
2023 in sports in Missouri
2022 in sports in Missouri